P. weirii may refer to:
 Phellinus weirii, a fungal plant pathogen
 Poria weirii, a fungal plant pathogen